("domain") is a Japanese historical term for the estate of a daimyo in the Edo period (1603–1868) and early Meiji period (1868–1912).  or  (daimyo domain) served as a system of de facto administrative divisions of Japan alongside the de jure provinces until they were abolished in the 1870s.

History

Pre-Edo period
The concept of  originated as the personal estates of prominent warriors after the rise of the Kamakura Shogunate in 1185, which also saw the rise of feudalism and the samurai noble warrior class in Japan. This situation existed for 400 years during the Kamakura Shogunate (1185–1333), the brief Kenmu Restoration (1333–1336), and the Ashikaga Shogunate (1336–1573).  became increasingly important as de facto administrative divisions as subsequent Shoguns stripped the Imperial provinces and their officials of their legal powers.

Edo period

Toyotomi Hideyoshi, the preeminent warlord of the late Sengoku period (1467–1603), caused a transformation of the  system during his reforms of the feudal structure of Japan. Hideyoshi's system saw the  become an abstraction based on periodic cadastral surveys and projected agricultural yields, rather than delineated territory. Hideyoshi died in 1598 and his young son Toyotomi Hideyori was displaced by Tokugawa Ieyasu after the Battle of Sekigahara in October 1600, but his new feudal system was maintained after Ieyasu established the Tokugawa Shogunate in 1603. The  belonged to daimyo, the powerful samurai feudal lords, who governed them as personal property with autonomy as a vassal of the Tokugawa Shogun. Ieyasu's successors further refined the system by introducing methods that ensured control of the daimyo and the imperial court. For instance, relatives and retainers were placed politically and militarily strategic districts while potentially hostile daimyo were transferred to unimportant geographic locations or their estates confiscated. They were also occupied with public works that kept them financially drained as the daimyo paid for the bakufu projects.

A daimyo was determined by the Tokugawa as a lord heading a  assessed at 10,000  (50,000 bushels) or more, and the output of their  contributed to their prestige or how their wealth were assessed. Early Japanologists such as Georges Appert and Edmond Papinot made a point of highlighting the annual  yields which were allocated for the Shimazu clan at Satsuma Domain since the 12th century. The Shogunal  and the Imperial provinces served as complementary systems which often worked in tandem for administration. When the Shogun ordered  the daimyos to make a census of their people or to make maps, the work was organized along the borders of the provinces. As a result, a  could overlap multiple provinces which themselves contained sections of multiple . In 1690, the richest  was the Kaga Domain, located in the provinces of Kaga, Etchū and Noto, with slightly over 1 million .

Meiji period

One of the main driving forces of the anti-Tokugawa movement was support for modernization and Westernization in Japan. In 1871, almost all of the domains were disbanded and replaced with a new Meiji system of prefectures which were directly subordinate to the national government in Tokyo.

However, in 1872, the Meiji government created the Ryukyu Domain after Japan formally annexed the Ryukyu Kingdom, a vassal state of the Shimazu clan of Satsuma since 1609. The Ryūkyū Domain was governed as a  headed by the Ryukyuan monarchy until it was finally abolished and became Okinawa Prefecture in March 1879.

See also 
 List of Han
 Han school
 Shōen
 Fanzhen
 Demesne

Notes

References
 Nussbaum, Louis-Frédéric and Käthe Roth. (2005).  Japan encyclopedia. Cambridge: Harvard University Press. ;  OCLC 58053128
 Totman, Conrad. (1993). Early Modern Japan. Berkeley: University of California Press. ;  OCLC 246872663

 
Economy of feudal Japan
Edo period
Government of feudal Japan